The Coţofeni culture, also known as the Baden-Coţofeni culture, and generally associated with the Usatove culture, was an Early Bronze Age archaeological culture that existed between 3500 and 2500 BC in the mid-Danube area of south-eastern Central Europe.

The first report of a Coţofeni find was made by Fr. Schuster in 1865 from the Râpa Roşie site in Sebeş (present-day Alba County, Romania). Since then, this culture has been studied by a number of people to varying degrees. Some of the more prominent contributors to the study of this culture include C. Gooss, K. Benkő, B. Orbán, G. Téglas, K. Herepey, S. Fenichel, Julius Teutsch, Cezar Bolliac, V. Christescu, Teohari Antonescu, and Cristian Popa.

Geographic area 
The Coţofeni culture area can be seen from two perspectives, as a fluctuation zone, or in its maximum area of extent. This covers present day Maramureş, some areas in Sătmar, the mountainous and hilly areas of Crişana, Transylvania, Banat, Oltenia, Muntenia (not including the North-East), and across the Danube in present-day eastern Serbia and northwestern Bulgaria.

Chronology

Absolute chronology 

Bronze Age in Romania
Unfortunately, most of the Coţofeni culture chronology is based on just three samples collected at three different Coţofeni sites. Based on these radiocarbon dates, this culture can be placed between roughly 3500 and 2500 BC.

Relative chronology 
Cultural synchronisms have been established based on mutual trade relations (visible as imported items) as well as stratigraphic observations. There is an evident synchronicity between:

Coţofeni I - Cernavoda III - Baden A - Spherical Amphorae; 

Coţofeni II - Baden B-C Kostolac; 

Coţofeni III - Kostolac-Vučedol A-B.

Relations with contemporary neighbouring cultures 

During the evolution of the Coţofeni culture, there were clearly relationships with other neighbouring cultures. The influence between the Coţofeni and their neighbours the Baden, Kostolac, Vučedol, Globular Amphora culture as well as the Ochre Burial populations was reciprocal. The areas bordering these cultures show cultural traits that have mixed aspects, for example Coţofeni-Baden and Coţofeni-Kostolac finds. These finds of mixed aspects suggest a cohabitation between related populations. It also supports the idea of well established trade between cultures.

Gallery

See also 
 Bronze Age in Romania
 Yamnaya culture
 Basarabi culture
 Otomani culture
 Pecica culture
 Wietenberg culture
 Prehistory of Transylvania
 Prehistoric Romania

Notes

References
 J. P. Mallory, "Usatavo Culture", Encyclopedia of Indo-European Culture, Fitzroy Dearborn, 1997.

External links 

Chalcolithic cultures of Europe
Archaeological cultures of Central Europe
Archaeological cultures of Southeastern Europe
Archaeological cultures in Bulgaria
Archaeological cultures in Moldova
Archaeological cultures in Romania
Archaeological cultures in Serbia
Archaeological cultures in Ukraine
Eneolithic Serbia
Bronze Age Serbia
Indo-European archaeological cultures